Popular Art Museum of Chalandritsa is a museum in Patras, Greece.

Museums in Patras
Folk art museums and galleries in Greece